Laird Koenig (born September 24, 1927) is an American author.  His best-known work is The Little Girl Who Lives Down the Lane, a novel published in 1974. The novel was adapted into the 1976 film of the same name starring Jodie Foster. He also wrote a play based on his novel.

Novels
 The Children are Watching (w. Peter L. Dixon) (Ballantine, 1970) (filmed as Attention, The Kids Are Watching, 1978)
 The Little Girl Who Lives Down the Lane (Coward-McCann & Geoghegan, Inc., 1974) (filmed 1976)
 Islands (Dell, 1980)
 The Neighbor (Avon, 1978) (filmed as Killing 'em Softly, 1982)
 The Disciple (Bantam, 1983)
 Rockabye (St. Martin's Press, 1981) (filmed 1986)
 The Sea Wife (Warner Books, 1986)
 Rising Sun (1986)
 Morning Sun : The Story of Madam Butterfly's Boy (Prospecta Press, 2012)

Plays
 The Dozens. Dramatist's Play Service, New York 1969
 The Little Girl Who Lives Down the Lane. Dramatist's Play Service, New York 1997,

Screenplays
 The Cat (w. William Redlin), 1966
 Flipper (TV series), episodes, 1966–1967
 The High Chaparral (TV series), episodes, 1970
 Red Sun [w. Dene Bart Petitclerc, William Roberts, Lawrence Roman], 1971
 The Little Girl Who Lives Down the Lane, 1976 (from own novel)
 Bloodline, 1979 (from Sidney Sheldon novel)
 Inchon (w. Robin Moore), 1981 (from story by Moore and Paul Savage)
 Rockabye, 1986 (from own novel)
 Stillwatch (w. David E. Peckinpah), 1987 (from Mary Higgins Clark novel)
 The Fulfilment of Mary Gray, 1989 (from LaVyrle Spencer novel)
 Tennessee Nights, 1989 (from Hans Werner Kettenbach novel)
 Lady Against the Odds [w. Bruce Murkoff], 1992 [from Rex Stout novel, The Hand in the Glove]

Awards and nominations

Adaptations
 (Unknown) for "Intrigues" (French TV series), 1985 (probably The Little Girl Who Lives Down the Lane)

References

20th-century American novelists
Living people
1927 births
20th-century American dramatists and playwrights
American male novelists
American male screenwriters
American television writers
American male television writers
Writers from Seattle
American male dramatists and playwrights
20th-century American male writers
Novelists from Washington (state)
Screenwriters from Washington (state)